Nepomyšl is a market town in Louny District in the Ústí nad Labem Region of the Czech Republic. It has about 400 inhabitants.

Administrative parts
Villages of Chmelištná, Dětaň, Dvérce and Nová Ves are administrative parts of Nepomyšl.

References

Populated places in Louny District
Market towns in the Czech Republic